Lamorinda AVA is an American Viticultural Area in the San Francisco Bay Area located due east of the Berkeley Hills in Contra Costa County encompassing the region around the cities of Lafayette, Moraga and Orinda. The name Lamorinda is a portmanteau from the names of the three locales defining the region: Lafayette, Moraga, and Orinda. The USDA plant hardiness zone for the AVA is 9b. The AVA was proposed as the growers in the area found the wider San Francisco Bay and Central Coast AVA titles too generic and not indicative of its terroir. The Lamorinda AVA was officially established in February 2016 by the Alcohol and Tobacco Tax and Trade Bureau (TTB).

Terroir 
The distinguishing features of the Lamorinda area are its topography, geology, soils, and climate. The terrain is composed of moderate-to-steep hills with narrow valleys. The steep hillsides prevent the use of machinery for vineyard work instead requiring the work to be done  manually. The terrain contrasts with the steeper, more rugged terrain to the south and west and the lower, flatter plains to the north and east. Additionally, Lamorinda AVA is characterized by a distinct suburban land use pattern which tends to provide property owners with enough room to plant vineyards large enough for commercial viticulture. This contrasts with the more urban and densely populated areas to the east and west. The dominant geological formation are the Orinda Formation, while the Briones and Mulholland Formations are also present. These underlying geological formations affect viticulture due to their role in forming the soils of the region. Other geographic formations dominate the surrounding areas.
The AVA is suitable for both cool and warm-climate varietals because the hilly terrain results in disparate levels of sunlight at different elevations. The Berkeley Hills affect the local climate by their elevation. The oceanic marine layer, which develops during the summer, bringing fog and low clouds with it, is usually less than 2,000 feet deep and thus is blocked by the range. This produces a "fog shadow" effect to the east, which is warmer than areas west of the hills. The westerly wind that carries the marine layer through the Golden Gate typically splits its flow as it hits the Berkeley Hills producing a southerly wind from Berkeley northward and a northerly wind in the direction of Oakland. In winter during spells of tule fog inland, a reverse situation occurs, with the fog usually confined to areas east of the hills. Rainfall is also affected by the higher elevations when westerly winds from the Pacific is perpendicular to the hills during a storm and forced to rise, cooling and condensing additional moisture, increasing the precipitation on the western slopes but leaving areas east of the hills drier.

Community Industry 
The wine industry from the Lamorinda region, including vineyard owners, winemakers, and a retail wine shop proprietors supported the establishment of the AVA due to the unique microclimates, soils, and geology of the region. It is far from being a commercial winegrowing area, instead hosting a number of small home wineries making just enough wine to satisfy the local demand. There is a strong sense of community identity and commitment in Lamorinda to help consumers to identify and buy its local wines.
The Lamorinda Wine Growers Association (LWGA) is dedicated to provide education and support resulting in the production of high quality grapes and wine in an environmentally-friendly and socially responsible fashion; promote the Lamorinda community and its status as a winegrowing region, enhancing the marketability of Lamorinda-grown grapes and Lamorinda-made wine; and cultivate a strong relationship with the local community.

References

External links
  Lamorinda Wine Growers Association
  TTB AVA Map

 
American Viticultural Areas
Geography of Contra Costa County, California
American Viticultural Areas of California
2016 establishments in California